Mittelangeln is an Amt ("collective municipality") in the district of Schleswig-Flensburg, in Schleswig-Holstein, Germany. The seat of the Amt is in Satrup, part of the municipality Mittelangeln. Before 1 January 2008, when the municipality Sörup joined, the Amt was named Satrup.

The Amt Mittelangeln consists of the following municipalities:

Mittelangeln
Schnarup-Thumby 
Sörup

References

Ämter in Schleswig-Holstein